"Fallen" is a song by American singer Mya, released as the second and final single from her third studio album, Moodring (2003). Written by Rich Shelton, Kevin Veney, Loren Hill, and Leonard Huggins, the mid-tempo track contains excerpts from The Pharcyde's 1995 song "Runnin'", which itself samples Luiz Bonfá's 1963 song "Saudade Vem Correndo", and lyrically addresses a woman falling head over heels in love with someone.

Despite generally positive reviews from contemporary music critics, who complimented Mya's voice and the song's arrangements, "Fallen" underperformed on the Billboard Hot 100, where it spent two non-consecutive weeks at its peak of number 51. It fared better on Billboards Hot R&B/Hip-Hop Songs chart, reaching number thirty-five. Due to its lackluster chart performance stateside, the single was not released internationally. "Fallen" remains Mya's last single to chart on the Hot 100, as well as her final single released under Interscope Records.

The song's accompanying music video, directed by Darren Grant and filmed in Toronto, featured Mýa stalking a potential lover. The video made its world premiere on BET's Access Granted in October 2003. "Fallen" and its Zone 4 remix featuring rapper Chingy were included on the soundtrack to the 2004 films A Cinderella Story and Barbershop 2: Back in Business, respectively.

Composition
Written and produced by production team One Up Entertainment, "Fallen" is a titillating mid-tempo jeep-banger which cleverly interpolates the Pharcyde's "Runnin'." It is performed in the key of F minor and set at a moderate beat at 94 beats per minute in common time.

Critical reception
Fallen Zone 4 remix was featured on The Village Voices Pazz & Jop end of the year critics list.

Commercial performance
"Fallen" debuted at number sixty-eight on the Billboard Hot 100 on the issue dated November 29, 2003 and reached its peak position of number fifty-one six weeks later, on the chart dated January 10, 2004. It spent a total of twelve consecutive weeks on the chart, and despite being Mýa's highest debut on the Hot 100, it is her third single to miss the top forty and the shortest-running single of her career to date. "Fallen" performed better on the Hot R&B/Hip-Hop Songs chart; it debuted at number seventy-four for the week of November 8, 2003, before peaking at number thirty-five on December 26, 2003, becoming Mýa's seventh non-consecutive top forty solo hit on the R&B chart.

Music video

A music video for "Fallen" was directed by Darren Grant. Shot in Toronto, the crew used the TTC subway as a backdrop for New York City. The concept behind the video was an idea Mýa had of stalking a potential lover, played by actor Hassan Johnson. The singer wrote the treatment for the video and pitched the idea around to different music video directors; Grant reached out to her and shared the same vision. Filming of the video was tracked by BET's Access Granted. "Fallen" made its world premiere on BET's Access Granted and 106 & Park on October 10, 2003 to coincide with Mýa's birthday.

Live performances
Mýa performed a medley of "Fallen" and "My Love Is Like...Wo" at The GQ Men of the Year Awards at The Regent Hotel on October 21, 2003.

Accolades

Track listings

Notes
 denotes additional remix producer
Sample credits
"Fallen" contains an excerpts from the composition "Saudade vem correndo" (1963) as performed by Stan Getz and written by Maria Toledo and Luiz Bonfá.

Credits and personnel
Credits adapted from the liner notes of Moodring.

Recording
 Recorded at The Record Plant (Hollywood, California) and Interscope Studios (Santa Monica, California)
 Mixed at Enterprise Studios (Burbank, California)
 Mastered at Oasis Mastering (Studio City, California)

Personnel

 Mýa – vocals
 Rich Shelton – production
 Loren Hill – production
 Kevin Veney – production
 Ron Fair – production, string arrangements, string conducting
 Frank Wolf – string recording
 Michael Valerio – bass
 Luis Conte – percussion
 Tal Herzberg – Pro Tools engineering
 Dave "Hard Drive" Pensado – mixing
 Ethan Willoughby – mix engineering assistance
 Eddy Schreyer – mastering

Charts

Release history

References

2003 singles
2003 songs
Interscope Records singles
Music videos directed by Darren Grant
Mýa songs
Songs written for films
Song recordings produced by Ron Fair
Songs with music by Luiz Bonfá
Songs written by Kevin Veney
Songs written by Rich Shelton